Eppegem is a village in the municipality of Zemst, Flemish Brabant, Belgium.

Eppegem lies on the river Zenne.
There is a cemetery of people who died in World War II next to the "Brusselsesteenweg".

References

Populated places in Flemish Brabant